San Bartolomeo in Pantano is a Romanesque and Gothic style, Roman Catholic church in Pistoia, Tuscany, central Italy, dedicated to St. Bartholomew the Apostle. The pantano of the name refers to the once marshy area in which the building was located.

History
The church and the adjacent Benedictine abbey were founded during the Lombard domination of Italy, between 726 and 767, by the Lombard physician Gaiduald or Guidoaldo. The Benedictines were established under the protection of the Marquises of Tuscany. In 1001, the Marquis Ugo the Great died in the abbey. The complex was first restored in the 12th century by Abbot Buono.

In 1433 the Benedictines, whose numbers had dwindled, were replaced by Canons Regular of the Lateran, which were related to the Augustinian canons. These were derived from the monastery associated with San Frediano. In the 17th-century, the  monastery was given to the Vallumbrosan Order, which remained here in 1810, the church then becoming a parish church.

Description
The church gained its present appearance at the time of Buono in 1159, rebuilt in the Pistoiese Romanesque style. Characteristic of this style is the façade, divided into five compartments with arches supported by slender columns, and with a marble bichrome decoration. The portal in the facade is graced with notable Romanesque sculptures; the architrave has a row of standing individuals in togas, depicting  "Jesus with the Twelve Apostles" (dated to 1167). Above are two male lions, one atop a guarding a recumbant man, the other atop a bird. Above the portal is a latin script.

The interior was much changed over the centuries, but a restoration held in 1951-1961 brought it to the original appearance. In the apse was found a Christ in Majesty between Saints and Angels from the late 13th century, attributed to Manfredino d'Alberto. The pulpit sculpted in the mid 13th century by Guido da Como was also restored. The wooden crucifix in the high altar is from an unknown sculptor with a style resembling that of Giovanni Pisano.

See also
San Pier Maggiore, Pistoia

References

8th-century churches in Italy
12th-century Roman Catholic church buildings in Italy
Bartolomeo in Pantano
Romanesque architecture in Pistoia